This is a list of members of the 26th National Council of Austria, the lower house of the bicameral legislature. The 26th National Council was elected in the 15 October 2017 legislative election, and was constituted in its first session on 9 November 2017. Its term ended on 22 October 2019.

Originally, the National Council comprised 62 members of the Austrian People's Party (ÖVP), 52 members of the Social Democratic Party of Austria (SPÖ), 51 members of the Freedom Party of Austria (FPÖ), 10 members of NEOS – The New Austria and Liberal Forum (NEOS), and 8 members of the Peter Pilz List (named JETZT from November 2018). By the dissolution of the National Council, there were  four non-attached members: Martha Bißmann (former PILZ, expelled), Efgani Dönmez (former ÖVP, expelled), David Lasar (former FPÖ, resigned), and Alma Zadić (former JETZT, expelled).

The President of the National Council was initially Elisabeth Köstinger (ÖVP). She resigned on 17 December 2017 in anticipation of being appointed to Cabinet Kurz I; Third President Norbert Hofer (FPÖ) resigned for the same reason on 18 December. On 20 December, Wolfgang Sobotka was elected to replace Köstinger, and Anneliese Kitzmüller to replace Hofer. They served until the National Council's dissolution. The Second President was Doris Bures (SPÖ), who served for the entirety of the legislative term.

Presidium

Parliamentary groups

List of members at dissolution

List of former members

References

Austria
Politics of Austria
Austrian Parliament
Organisations based in Vienna